Arisaema section Anomala is a section of the genus Arisaema.

Description
Plants in this section are evergreen and subtropical to tropical with rhizomes with a reddish purple interior. Leaves are trifoliate, Spadix bisexual or rarely unisexual when mature.

Distribution
Plants from this section are found from China and India to Southeast Asia.

Species
Arisaema section Anomala comprises the following species:

References

Plant sections